Bert Graham (1 March 1921 – 11 August 1994) was an Australian rules footballer who played for the Hawthorn Football Club in the Victorian Football League (VFL).

Notes

External links 

1921 births
1994 deaths
Australian rules footballers from Victoria (Australia)
Hawthorn Football Club players